Tiholmane is a group of ten small islands that form part of Thousand Islands, an archipelago south of Edgeøya in Svalbard. The largest of the islands are Lurøya, Kalvøya, Langåra and Rugla. The group also includes the smaller Sperra, Spunset, Bommen, Proppen, Rullesteinøya and Røysholmen.

References 

 Norwegian Polar Institute Place Names of Svalbard Database

Islands of Svalbard